are Japanese style kitchen knives primarily used to cut fish, though also used when cutting meat. They come in different sizes, sometimes up to 30 cm (12 inches) in length. The deba bōchō first appeared during the Edo period in Sakai. It is designed to behead and fillet fish. Its thickness, and often a more obtuse angle on the back of the heel allow it to cut off the heads of fish without damage. The rest of the blade is then used to ride against the fish bones, separating the fillet.

Maintenance
Traditionally, these are made of carbon steel, which needs regular maintenance and oiling to prevent rust. However, many modern knives are also available in stainless steel. The carbon steel blades can be honed into a sharper cutting edge. The deba is not intended for chopping large diameter bones.

See also
Japanese cutlery 
List of Japanese cooking utensils

References

 Nancy Hachisu, Japanese Farm Food, Andrews McMeel Publishing, 2012, page 17
 Shizuo Tsuji, Japanese Cooking: A Simple Art,  Kodansha, 2006, page 111
 Hiroko Shimbo, The Japanese Kitchen: 250 Recipes in a Traditional Spirit - Harvard Common Press, 2000, page 12

External links
Custom Pocket Knives

Japanese kitchen knives